Cégep Limoilou is a French-language CEGEP in the province of Quebec, situated in La Cité-Limoilou, a borough of Quebec City.

Cégep Limoilou offers pre-university and technical programs, continuing education and corporate services. It has 6 faculties and 43 programs leading to a Diploma of College Studies (DEC) and 20 programs lead to an Attestation of College Studies (AEC).

Programs
Pre-university programs (DEC), which take two years to complete, cover the subject matter which roughly corresponds to the additional year of high school given elsewhere in Canada in preparation for a chosen field in university.
Visual Arts
Creative Arts
Communication, cinema and creativity
Languages
Theatre
International Stakes and Languages (Double DEC)
Natural Sciences
Health Sciences
Pure and Applied Sciences
Computer Sciences and Mathematics
Social Sciences
Administration and Economic Environment
International Stakes
Human Development and Society
Education
International Stakes and Languages (Double DEC)
Technical programs (DEC): Technical programs, which take three-years to complete, applies to students who wish to pursue a skill trade.
3-D Animation and Image Synthesis
Office Automation, Desktop Publishing and Hypermedia
Business Management
Accounting and Management
Electronics
Audiovisual
Telecommunication
Industrial Electronics
Industrial Engineering
Civil Engineering
Mechanical Engineering
Computerized System
Mechanical Manufacturing
Drawing-Design
Building Services Engineering
Geomatic
Mapping
Geodesy
Computer Science
Administrative Data Processing
Network Management
Tourism (Bilingual DEC)
Hotel Management
Food Service Management
Nursing
Dietetics
Circus Arts
Applied Arts
Ceramics
Artisanal Textile Construction
Jewellery
Stringed-instrument (Violin or Guitar)
Sculpture
Certificates (AEC)
Nursing
3-D Animation
Office Automation and Accounting
Business Management
Financial Management and Electronic Accounting System
Company Supervision
Multimedia Production
Video Game Design
Computer-aided Design and Manufacturing
Sale and Merchandise
Human Resources Supervision
Network Architecture and Management
Advanced Cisco Routers Management
Advanced Network Security
Advanced Telephony over IP
Telecommunication
Programmer Analyst
Geomatics
Mapping
Quality Control of Civil Engineering Materials

Faculties
Campus de Québec (Head office)
1300, 8e Avenue, Quebec, Quebec G1J 5L5 
418.647.6600

Campus de Charlesbourg
7600, 3e Avenue Est, Quebec, Quebec G1H 7L4 
418.647.6600

Pavillon des métiers d'art
299, 3e Avenue, Québec (Québec) G1L 2V7 
418.647.0567

Maison des métiers d'art
367, boulevard Charest Est, Québec (Québec) G1K 3H3 
418.524.7337

Institut québécois d'ébénisterie
14, rue Soumande, bureau 1-14, Québec (Québec) G1L 0A4
418.525.7060

École de cirque de Québec
750, 2e Avenue, Québec (Québec) G1L 3B7
418.525.0101

The College of General and Vocational Education is affiliated with the ACCC and CCAA.

History
In 1967, several institutions were merged and became public ones, when the Quebec system of CEGEPs was created.

See also
List of colleges in Quebec
Higher education in Quebec
Titans du Cégep Limoilou women's ice hockey

References

External links
 Cégep Limoilou 

Educational institutions established in 1967
Limoilou
Education in Quebec City
Buildings and structures in Quebec City
1967 establishments in Quebec